Venison Creek may refer to:
 Venison Creek (Ontario), a tributary to Big Creek, which flows into Lake Erie
 Venison Creek (Michigan), in Gladwin County, 
 Venison Creek (Wisconsin), in Sawyer County,